Michael Yamashita is a Japanese-American photographer known for his work in National Geographic, as well as his many iconic photographs, books and exhibitions.

Background 
Born in 1949 in San Francisco, California, and raised in Montclair, New Jersey. Yamashita graduated from Montclair Academy in 1967. He graduated from Wesleyan University with a degree in Asian studies, and after college in 1971, he traveled to Japan to teach English. After joining a photo club to work on his Japanese, he was inspired to pursue photography professionally. After living and shooting throughout Asia for seven years, he returned to the US where he started working for the National Geographic in 1979. Since then, he has traveled and photographed places as diverse as Somalia, Sudan, England, Ireland, and Papua New Guinea, Iraq, Afghanistan, and Iran, with special concentration on Asia & the Silk Road, including Japan, China and Tibet. He is also a frequent lecturer, including with TedX, teaches and conducts photo workshops across Asia and the United States. He is a China ambassador for Sony Cameras.

Personal life 

Yamashita lives and works in Chester Township, New Jersey, with his wife and frequent collaborator, Elizabeth Bibb, where he also serves as a volunteer fireman .

Publications

Books by Michael Yamashita

Contributions

 
 
 United States Postage stamp: 90 cents, Hagatna Bay, Guam single, 2007.

Filmography 
Finnigan, Jonathan (director) Jennifer Lee (writer). Marco Polo: The China Mystery Revealed. Produced by Michael Yamashita, Craig Leeson and Farland Chang. United States.

Finnigan, Jonathan (director) (2005). Ghost Fleet - The Epic Voyage of Zheng He (Motion picture). Produced by Michael Yamashita. United States: National Geographic, Channel Asia.

References

Living people
1949 births
American artists of Japanese descent
Montclair Kimberley Academy alumni
People from Chester Township, New Jersey
People from Montclair, New Jersey
People from San Francisco
Photographers from New Jersey
Wesleyan University alumni